The following lists events that happened during 1989 in the Republic of Zaire.

Incumbents 
 President: Mobutu Sese Seko
 Prime Minister: Léon Kengo wa Dondo

Events

Births 

 22 June - Christian Eyenga, basketball player

See also

 Zaire
 History of the Democratic Republic of the Congo

References

Sources

 
Years of the 20th century in Zaire
Zaire
Zaire